NGC 2552 is a Magellanic spiral galaxy located some 22 million light years away. It can be found in  constellation of Lynx. This is a type of unbarred dwarf galaxy, usually with a single spiral arm. It is inclined by 41° to the line of sight from the Earth along a position angle of 229°. The measured velocity dispersion of the stars in NGC 2552 is relatively low—a mere 19 ± 2 km/s. This galaxy forms part of a loose triplet that includes NGC 2541 and NGC 2500, which together belong to the NGC 2841 group.

References

External links

astronomerica.awardspace.com NGC2552  image

Unbarred spiral galaxies 
Irregular galaxies 
2552
Lynx (constellation)
023340